Freo may refer to:

 Freyja, the Norse goddess
 Fremantle, a port town in Western Australia
 Fremantle Football Club, a team in the Australian Football League commonly referred to as the "Freo Dockers"